Battle of Quiberon may refer to:
 Battle of Quiberon Bay
 Battle of Quiberon (1795)